The Cuban moist forests is a tropical moist broadleaf forest ecoregion that occupies  on Cuba and Isla de la Juventud. Soils are usually derived from quartz, limestone, or serpentinites. Cuban moist forests can be differentiated into lowland forests (sea level to ), sub-montane forests, and montane forests.

Lowland forests
They consist of three tree stories. The upper story includes achiotillo (Alchornea latifolia), najesí (Carapa guianensis) and acana (Manilkara valenzuelana); the middle story has tagua-tagua (Diospyros caribaea), Ocotea floribunda, Oxandra laurifolia, Talauma minor, Terminalia spp. and Ficus spp.; and the lower story has a number of species of tree ferns, Myrtaceae and Melastomataceae. Epiphytes are abundant and varied, including the endemic Hymenodium crinitum, Oleandra articulata, Columnea tincta, and Psychotria pendula. Typical palms are Calyptronoma plumeriana, Prestoea acuminata var. montana and Bactris cubensis. Heliconia species, mosses, and liverworts are also important plants.

Sub-montane forests
Achiotillo (Alchornea latifolia), júcare amarillo (Buchenavia capitata), purío prieto (Guatteria blainii), Licaria jamaicensis, roble macho (Tabebuia hypoleuca) and Zanthoxylum elephantiasis grow in the upper story. Cuaba de la maestra (Amyris lineata), cuajaní (Prunus myrtifolia), Ditta myricoides, Laplacea spp., Oxandra laurifolia, Ocotea spp., Rapanea ferruginea and Podocarpus species can be found in the lower story. Tree ferns, Myrtaceae and Melastomataceae and Rubiaceae flourish in the understory.

Montane forests

The upper story is dominated by barril (Cyrilla racemiflora), marañon de la Maestra (Magnolia cubensis), Persea anomala and Laplacea angustifolia. The lower story consists of Cleyera nimanimae, Freziera grisebachii, Haenianthus salicifolius, Lyonia species, Torralbasia cuneata and enebro (Juniperus saxicola). Epiphytes, mosses, ferns, terrestrial orchids, and clubmosses are abundant.

Fauna
Birds of Cuba's moist forests include the Cuban tody (Todus multicolor), bee hummingbird (Mellisuga helenae), Cuban trogon (Priotelus temnurus), Cuban solitaire (Myadestes elisabeth), Cuban kite (Chondrohierax wilsonii), red-legged honeycreeper (Cyanerpes cyaneus), Cuban parakeet (Aratinga euops), stygian owl (Asio stygius) and Gundlach's hawk (Accipiter gundlachi).  The rare Cuban solenodon (Solenodon cubanus), a small mammal, is endemic to eastern montane forests.  Other notable mammals include the hutias, 4-5 species of small to medium-sized, climbing rodents related to the Guinea Pig.

See also
Cuban dry forests
Cuban pine forests
List of ecoregions in Cuba

References

Neotropical tropical and subtropical moist broadleaf forests
Ecoregions of the Caribbean
Ecoregions of Cuba

Natural history of Cuba